The Unbroken Voice is a Colombian telenovela that aired on Caracol Televisión from 11 January 2022 to 13 April 2022. The series is based on the life of Colombian singer Arelys Henao. Mariana Gómez stars as Henao.

Cast

Main 
 Mariana Gómez as Luz Arelys Henao Ruiz
 José Ramón Barreto as Wilfredo Hurtado
 Yuri Vargas as Yazmín
 Juan Sebastián Calero as Alonso Henao
 Luis Eduardo Motoa as Tano Henao
 Victoria Ortiz as Clara Inés Ríos
 Ana María Pérez as María Ruiz
 Sebastián Giraldo as Fernando "Nando" Henao Ruiz
 Daniel Mira as Martín Henao Ruiz
 Jim Muñoz as Fabián
 Carmenza Cossio
 Anderson Ballesteros as Óscar Vargas "Patoco"

Recurring and guest 
 María José Correa as Alba Henao Ruiz
 Luis Alberto Rojas
 Juanita Molina
 Marcela Vanegas
 Simón Savi as Samuel
 Jairo Ordóñez
 Natalia Lara
 Juan Camilo Pérez
 María Alejandra Duque as Gabriela
 Juan Pablo Acosta
 Valentina Duque
 Luis Bernal
 Juan Vargas Millán as Matías
 Isabella Betancur
 Mauricio Mejía as Uriel
 Tatiana Arango as Sofía
 Freddy Ordóñez
 Camila Taborda
 Juan Sebastián Velandia
 Henry Montealegre as Lázaro Henao Ruiz
 Felipe Bernedette as Jerónimo

Episodes

Reception

Ratings

Awards and nominations

References

External links 
 

2022 telenovelas
2022 Colombian television series debuts
2022 Colombian television series endings
Colombian telenovelas
Caracol Televisión telenovelas
Spanish-language telenovelas
Television series based on singers and musicians
Television shows set in Colombia